U-102 may refer to one of the following German submarines:

 , a Type U 57 submarine launched in 1917 and that served in the First World War until sunk between 28 and 30 September 1918
 During the First World War, Germany also had these submarines with similar names:
 , a Type UB III submarine launched in 1918 and surrendered on 22 November 1918; broken up at La Spezia in July 1919
 , a Type UC III submarine launched in 1918 and surrendered on 22 November 1918; broken up at Dordrecht in 1922
 , a Type VIIB submarine that served in the Second World War until sunk on 1 July 1940

Submarines of Germany